This is a list of holidays in Latvia.

References
Latvia's National Holidays, Remembrance and Festive Days, the Latvian Institute
Law on public holidays, remembrance days and days of significance (In Latvian)

 
Society of Latvia
Observances in Latvia
Latvia
Holidays